Tepatlaxco is a municipality located in the montane central zone in the State of Veracruz, about 55 km from state capital Xalapa. It has a surface of 99.53 km2. During the 18th century he is named the people San Martín Ocotitlán, By decree of June 23, 1890 the limits were fixed between the municipalities of Tepatlaxco and Ixhuatlan.

Geographic Limits

The municipality of  Tepatlaxco  is delimited to the north by Huatusco,  to the north-east by Zentla, to the south-east by Paso del Macho, to the south by Atoyac and to the west by Ixhuatlán del Café. It is watered by small creeks that are a tributary of the river Jamapa.

Agriculture

It produces principally maize, beans, sugarcane, and coffee.

Celebrations

In  Tepatlaxco , in June takes place the celebration in honor to San Antonio de Padua, Patrón of the town, and in December takes place the celebration in honor to Virgen de Guadalupe.

Weather

The weather in  Tepatlaxco  is cold and wet all year with rains in summer and autumn.

References

External links 

  Municipal Official webpage
  Municipal Official Information

Municipalities of Veracruz